Dulaylat al Mutayrat  is a town in the Madaba Governorate of north-western Jordan.

References

External Links
Photos of Duleilat el Muteirat at the American Center of Research

Populated places in Madaba Governorate